C. Sathya is an Indian music composer and playback singer. He debuted in Tamil films as the music composer in the sleeper hit film Engeyum Eppodhum. After this movie, he was signed to many other movies and has successfully composed for more than 10 movies. He is well known in the industry for his different melodic music.

Career
Coming from a Carnatic background has helped Sathya grasp the techniques of film music composition. A Carnatic singer, he also knows to play the harmonium. This has made it easier for him to master the keyboard, which he has played as well as programmed for several music directors, including Bharadwaj. Sathya had to wait long to get his first break. He says, "My first film was Yen Ippadi Mayakinai in 2009, which has not yet released. The songs did well in the audio circuit and almost three years later, when the producers of Engeyum Eppodhum heard the compositions, they signed me up". That film was considered a sleeper hit, and Sathya arrived on the music scene. In quick succession, he did Sevarkodi and Ponmalai Pozhudhu.

Discography

As music composer

Upcoming films
Jet Lee (delayed)
Jasmine (delayed)

Aleka (TBA)
Aayiram Jenmangal (TBA)

As singer
 "Maasama Aaru Maasama" - Engeyum Eppodhum (2011)
 "Thamirabharani" - Nedunchaalai (2013)
 "Azhagendral" - Theeya Velai Seiyyanum Kumaru (2013)
 "Lovela Lovela" - Ivan Veramathiri  (2013)
 "Oru Paravai" - Vani Rani (TV series)  (2013)
 "Silatta Pilatta" - Kanchana 2 (2015)
 "Enna Petha Devadhaiye" - Theal (2021)

Television

 2002 Mangalyam
 2003 Adugiran Kannan
 2005 Dheerga Sumangali
 2006 Kana Kaanum Kaalangal
 2006 Chellamadi Nee Enakku
 2007 Madurai
 2008 Rekha IPS
 2008 Thiruppaavai
 2009 Mama Mappillai
 2010 Anu Pallavi
 2010 Alaipayuthey
 2010 Amman
 2011 Saravanan Meenatchi ('Yaelelo' Tittle Track)
 2012 Vellai Thamarai
 2012 Paartha Nyabagam Illayo
 2013 Kurunji Malar
 2013 Vani Rani
 2014 Kalyana Parisu
 2015 Yazhini
 2018 Maya
 2018 Nayagi
 2018 Lakshmi Stores
 2018 Vandhal Sridevi
 2020 Uyire

Accolades 
 Jaya Award For Sensational Music Debut  – Engeyum Eppodhum

References

External links

C. Sathya on Spotify

Living people
Tamil musicians
Tamil film score composers
Musicians from Chennai
1974 births